Dennis Merzel (born June 3, 1944 in Brooklyn, New York) is an American Zen and spirituality teacher, also known as Genpo Merzel.

Biography

Early life
Dennis Paul Merzel was born on June 3, 1944 in Brooklyn, New York and was raised and schooled in Long Beach, California. His family was Jewish (his grandfather was a Rabbi), but he was raised as an agnostic by his father and as an atheist by his mother. He was a champion swimmer and an all-American water polo player. He was a lifeguard and began teaching public school while obtaining a master's degree in educational administration from the University of Southern California.

Zen Buddhism
While on a trip in 1971 to the Mojave Desert in California with two friends, Merzel had what he described as an "awakening experience". Following this, he left his career as a school teacher for a year to live in the mountains alone in a cabin near San Luis Obispo. In 1972 he met the Japanese-born Zen teacher Taizan Maezumi, and moved to Los Angeles to study under him. 
Merzel was ordained as an unsui, or novice priest, in 1973. In 1980, a year after completing formal Kōan study, Merzel received dharma transmission, becoming Maezumi's second Dharma successor. In 1981 Merzel underwent zuise in Japan, and in 1988 he was officially installed as abbot of Hosshinji Zen temple in Bar Harbor, Maine. In 1995 Merzel received the title of Dendō-kyōshi Kenshuso, a now defunct category officially recognizing Western Zen priests by the Sōtō School Headquarters in Japan (Sōtō-shū) . In 1996 Merzel received Inka from Bernie Glassman, after Maezumi's death in 1995. This made Merzel Bernie Glassman's first Inka successor and made him the second in Maezumi Roshi's lineage to be recognized as a Zen Master. Merzel is the founder and former Abbot of Kanzeon Zen Center.

Big Mind
In 1983 Merzel began studying Voice Dialogue—a Jungian therapeutic technique designed to expand the individual's ability to make choices in life rather than to behave in an automatic and unconscious fashion—with Hal and Sidra Stone. Shortly thereafter, he began to experiment with integrating Voice Dialogue with the Zen tradition, and in 1999 he introduced the Big Mind Process™. The aim of the Big Mind Process is to combine "Eastern, Buddhist insights with Western psychoanalytical ideas," and according to Merzel: 

Merzel has organized Big Mind™ retreats and events nationally and internationally, such as an annual event in the Netherlands that has attracted hundreds of participants. Responses to Big Mind have been variously negative and positive.

A randomized clinical trial of Merzel's Big Mind process has been carried out as part of a masters thesis "to test the hypothesis that a Zen training method using a self-based dialogue approach called Big Mind (Merzel, 2007) produces significant changes in subjective experience that are similar to the spiritual experiences of long-term meditators during deep meditation and, second, to examine whether the effect brings about any lasting positive psychological improvements in both spirituality and well-being measures." The participants appeared to score higher on various measures after participation, but the reported effects may also result from factors such as group effect, suggestibility, and/or simple expectation, and the study may have limited generalizability due to the high level of education of the participants.

Resignation from White Plum
In 1988 Merzel was installed as abbot at Hosshinji, a Zen temple in Bar Harbor, Maine. He was alleged to have had a romantic relationship with a student, leading to the dissolution of the temple.

In August 1992, a group of 12 American Zen teachers sent a letter to Taizan Maezumi, expressing concern about Merzel's relationships with a number of female students, his lack of remorse, and his lack of responsibility. They asked Maezumi to withdraw Merzel's sanction to teach.

In February 2011, after admitting to three extra-marital affairs, Merzel said he would disrobe as a Buddhist priest, resign as an elder of the White Plum Asanga, step down as Abbot of Kanzeon, and stop teaching for an indefinite period to seek counseling.

Forty-four American Buddhist teachers wrote a letter suggesting that Merzel take a minimum one-year break from teaching and seek therapy.

By April, Merzel had reversed his position, saying that too many students and his organizations depended on him financially and spiritually.<ref group=news name="sltrib.com">[http://www.sltrib.com/sltrib/news/51768224-78/merzel-zen-kanzeon-mind.html.csp?page=2 The Salt Lake Tribune, Zen teachers are livid Utah colleague in sex scandal still teaching]</ref>

Sixty-six American Buddhist teachers responded with a public letter to Merzel requesting that he follow through with his stated intention to stop teaching for some time. Merzel continued to lead retreats.
It was reported that he and his wife were divorcing.

He continues to serve as president and abbot of Kanzeon Zen Center, now called Big Heart Zen Sangha.

Heirs
Dennis Merzel has given Dharma transmission to 23 heirs, and authorized 15 to teach as Zen Masters. He has given Jukai to 518 students and ordained 139 Priests.

Dharma successors
 Catherine Genno Pagès (1992), Dana Zen Center, Paris, France
 John Shodo Flatt (1994, deceased), England
 Anton Tenkei Coppens (1996), Zen River, The Netherlands 
 Malgosia Jiho Braunek (2003, deceased), Kandzeon Sangha, Warsaw, Poland 
 Daniel Doen Silberberg (2003), Lost Coin Zen, San Francisco, USA
 Nico Sojun Tydeman (2004), Zen Centrum Amsterdam
 Nancy Genshin Gabrysch (2006), England
 Diane Musho Hamilton (2006), Boulder Mountain Zendo, Utah, USA
 Michael Mugaku Zimmerman (2006), Boulder Mountain Zendo, Utah, USA
 Rich Taido Christofferson (2007), Seattle, Washington, USA
 Michel Genko Dubois (2007), L'Association Dana, France 
 Tamara Myoho Gabrysch (2008), Zen River, The Netherlands
 Maurice Shonen Knegtel (2009), Izen, The Netherlands
 KC Kyozen Sato (2009), Salt Lake City, Utah, USA
 Judi Kanchi Warren (2010, deceased)
 Mark Daitoku Esterman (2014), Salt Lake Zen Group, Utah, USA
 Mary Ellen Seien Sloan (2017), Salt Lake City, Utah, USA
Christian Jikishin von Wolkahof (2018), Dusseldorf, Germany
Lynn Shozen Holbrook (2019), Salt Lake City, Utah
Stefan Kenjitsu Coppens (2019), Kanzeon Zen Centrum, The Netherlands
Krzysztof Furyu Leśniak (2019), Lublin, Poland
Hank Yoshin Malinowski (2019), Amsterdam, The Netherlands
Jacqueline Shosui Wellenstein (2019), Voorburg, The Netherlands

Inka transmission
Inka transmission conferring the title of Zen Master on fifteen Zen teachers: 
 John Daido Loori (deceased), Zen Mountain Monastery, New York, USA
 Catherine Genno Pages, Dana Zen Center, Paris, France
 Anton Tenkei Coppens, Zen River, The Netherlands
 Jan Chozen Bays, Zen Community of Oregon, USA
 Charles Tenshin Fletcher, Yokoji Zen Mountain Center, Idyllwild, California, USA
 Nicolee Jikyo McMahon, Three Treasures Zen Community, San Diego County, California, USA
 Susan Myoyu Anderson, Great Plains Zen Center, Wisconsin and Illinois, Great Wave Zen Sangha, Michigan, USA
 Sydney Musai Walters, Prajna Zendo, Lamy, New Mexico, USA
 Malgosia Jiho Braunek (deceased), Kandzeon Sangha, Warsaw, Poland
 Nancy Genshin Gabrysch, Kannon-ji Temple, Bilsborrow, England
 Daniel Doen Silberberg (2003), Lost Coin Zen, San Francisco, USA
Maurice Shonen Knegtel, Izen, The Netherlands
Tamara Myoho Gabrysch, Zen River, The Netherlands
Nico Sojun Tydeman, Zen Centrum Amsterdam
Rein Konpo Kaales, White Cloud Zen, Idaho

Publications

Books
 The Eye Never Sleeps: Striking to the Heart of Zen (1991, Shambhala Publications)
 Beyond Sanity and Madness the Way of Zen Master Dogen (1994, Tuttle Publishing)
 24/7 Dharma: Impermanence, No-Self, Nirvana (2001, Journey Editions)
 The Path of the Human Being: Zen Teachings on the Bodhisattva Way (2005, Shambhala Publications)
 Big Mind, Big Heart: Finding Your Way (2007, Big Mind Publishing)
 The Fool Who Thought He Was God (2013, Big Mind Publishing)
 Spitting Out the Bones: A Zen Master's 45 Year Journey (2016, Big Mind Publishing)

DVDs
 Big Mind Big Heart Revealed The Path of the Human Being Awakened by the 10,000 Dharmas From Student to Master Masculine and Feminine Energies The Teachings of Bodhidharma''

See also 
Timeline of Zen Buddhism in the United States

Notes

References

Book references

Web references

Newspapers and magazines references

Letters from Zen teachers

Sources

External links

 Big Mind Organisation
 Sweeping Zen, Genpo Merzel Collection
 

Zen Buddhism writers
Sanbo Kyodan Buddhists
Living people
USC Rossier School of Education alumni
American Zen Buddhists
American Zen Buddhist spiritual teachers
Converts to Buddhism
20th-century American Jews
1944 births
Writers from Brooklyn
21st-century American Jews